Chemokine (C-C motif) ligand 23 (CCL23) is a small cytokine belonging to the CC chemokine family that is also known as Macrophage inflammatory protein 3 (MIP-3) and Myeloid progenitor inhibitory factor 1 (MPIF-1).  CCL23 is predominantly expressed in lung and liver tissue, but is also found in bone marrow and placenta. It is also expressed in some cell lines of myeloid origin. CCL23 is highly chemotactic for resting T cells and monocytes and slightly chemotactic for neutrophils. It has also been attributed to an inhibitory activity on hematopoietic progenitor cells.  The gene for CCL23 is located on human chromosome 17 in a locus containing several other CC chemokines.  CCL23 is a ligand for the chemokine receptor CCR1.

References

Cytokines